PT Asiatic Persada is a palm oil firm from Jambi, Indonesia. It was founded in 1979.
Wilmar International has sold PT Asiatic Persada due to its alleged involvement in land grabs.
The forest of Bungku village was cleared for giant palm oil plantations of PT Asiatic Persada in the mid-1980s. In the following years, the company’s bulldozers illegally claimed a further  of rain forest — an area about half the size of Berlin, including areas for which indigenous peoples held guaranteed land rights. Ganda Group, owned by Ganda Sitorus, the younger brother of Martua Sitorus, the co-founder of Wilmar International, bought PT Asiatic Persada in 2013. In the same year, the governor of Jambi urged officials to review PT Asiatic Persada’s license because of violations of the law. Copies of the letter were also sent to the Justice Ministry and the national police chief.

References

Palm oil companies of Indonesia
Agriculture companies established in 1979